Lagerstroemia langkawiensis is a species of small tree in the family Lythraceae. It is endemic to Langkawi Island, Western Malaysia. It is threatened by habitat loss.

References

langkawiensis
Endemic flora of Peninsular Malaysia
Trees of Peninsular Malaysia
Endangered flora of Asia
Taxonomy articles created by Polbot